

Incumbents
President: Alexandros Zaimis
Prime Minister: 
 until 26 May: Eleftherios Venizelos
 26 May-5 June: Alexandros Papanastasiou
 5 June-4 November: Eleftherios Venizelos
 from 4 November: Panagis Tsaldaris

Events
25 April – Greece decides to abandon the gold standard.
3 June – The government of Greek Prime Minister Alexandros Papanastasiou resigns after one week in office.
25 September – The result of the Greek legislative election is an ambivalent one for the two leading parties, the Liberal Party of Eleftherios Venizelos and the People's Party. The People's Party receives a plurality of votes in the Lower House elections, but wins fewer seats than the Liberal Party; the Liberals also win the most seats in the Senate.
December – The Greek National Socialist Party is founded by George S. Mercouris.

Births
21 May – Leonidas Vasilikopoulos, admiral (died 2014)
29 August – Lakis Petropoulos, footballer and manager (died 1996)

Deaths
13 December – Georgios Jakobides, painter (born 1853)

External links 

 
Greece
Years of the 20th century in Greece